Anaphe may refer to:
 Anaphe (city), an ancient Greek island and city-state
 Anaphe (moth), a genus of moths